"Alphabet St." is a song from American musician Prince's 1988 album, Lovesexy. It was the first single from that album and the album's only top 10 single, reaching the top 10 in both the UK and US. Initially written as an acoustic blues song, the song's final version includes a rap by Cat Glover and is full of samples. "Alphabet St." generally echoes themes from the rest of Lovesexy.

The B-side is a remix of "Alphabet St." called "Alphabet St. ("This is not music, this is a trip")". The title and other phrases are repeated at the beginning of the song, but essentially it is an instrumental with a few minor changes. "Alphabet St." was the first Prince single released as a CD, albeit only in the UK and Japan. A promo CD was issued in the US.

Music video
Directed by P.R. "Spot" Epstein and produced on very short notice on a snowy Sunday by filmmaker Michael R. Barnard, the music video for "Alphabet St." shows Prince walking and driving through an environment made out of letters. The video contains hidden messages. The first one appears after the end of the first verse ("She'll want me from my head to my feet"), where there is a split second image with the hidden message "Don't buy The Black Album, I'm sorry." The second image says B "heaven is so beautiful"; the third image is D "4 the light dance"; the fourth image is G "funk guitar"; the fifth image is H (heroin) "is 4 punks"; the sixth image, when Prince is in the Thunderbird, says "if U don't mind".

Track listings
 7-inch single
A. "Alphabet St." (edit) – 2:25
B. "Alphabet St." (cont.) – 3:14

 12-inch and CD single
 "Alphabet St." (album version) – 5:38
 "Alphabet St. ("This is not music, this is a trip")" – 7:48

 CD promo
 "Alphabet St." (edit) – 2:25
 "Alphabet St." (LP version) – 5:38
 "Alphabet St." (extended version) – 5:40
 "Alphabet St. ("This is not music, this is a trip")" [Listed as "Alphabet St."] – 7:48

Personnel 

 Prince – lead vocals and various instruments
 Sheila E. – drums
 Eric Leeds – saxophone
 Atlanta Bliss – trumpet
 Cat Glover – rap

Charts

Weekly charts

Year-end charts

Cover versions
 Scottish noise pop band The Jesus and Mary Chain covered this song which appears on their 1994 single "Come On".
 Sufjan Stevens provides a cover on his second Christmas collection Silver & Gold: Songs for Christmas, Vols. 6–10.
 Leo Kottke and Mike Gordon covered this song on their 2020 album Noon.

Sampling
 Nine Inch Nails sampled "Alphabet St." for the song "Ringfinger" from their 1989 album Pretty Hate Machine.
 Part of the rap section was used in the 1990 Ween song "L.M.L.Y.P.". Prince's "No!" scream intro also replaces the word "shit" on the radio edit of their 1993 song "Push th' Little Daisies".
 1990s hip-hop group Arrested Development sampled a word from "Alphabet St." for their breakout song "Tennessee" in 1992. The group were sued for their unauthorized use of the word "Tennessee" and had to pay Prince $100,000.
 In 1992, Czech singer Lucie Bílá sampled the beat and guitar riff for her song "Láska je láska" which became the most successful hit of the year in Czech Republic.

References

Prince (musician) songs
1988 singles
1988 songs
Music videos directed by Prince (musician)
Number-one singles in New Zealand
Number-one singles in Norway
Paisley Park Records singles
Song recordings produced by Prince (musician)
Songs written by Prince (musician)
Warner Records singles